Aiglon du Lamentin (Le Lamentin)
Anses d'Arlet
Case-Pilote
Colonial (Fort-de-France)
Diamantinoise (Le Diamant)
Emulation (Schœlcher)
Essor-Préchotain (Le Prêcheur)
Etoile  (Basse-Pointe) (newly promoted)
Franciscain (Le François)
La Gauloise de Trinité
Golden Lion
Golden Star (Fort-de-France)
New Club (Petit-Bourg)
Rapid Club Lorrain (newly promoted)
Réveil-Sportif (Gros-Morne)
Rivière-Pilote
Robert
Saint-Joseph
Samaritaine (Ste.-Marie) (newly promoted)
Stade Spiritain
Vert-Pré

 
Martinique

Football clubs